The Silver Shadow Stakes is an Australian Turf Club Group 2 Thoroughbred horse race for three-year-old fillies, run at set weights with penalties, over a distance of 1200 metres at Randwick Racecourse, Sydney, Australia in August. Total prizemoney for the race is A$200,000.

History

The race is named in honour of the 1975 Warwick Stakes winner Silver Shadow. The race is held on the same racecard as the Warwick Stakes now known as the Winx Stakes.

Distance
 1980–1988 – 1200 metres
 1989 – 1160 metres
 1990 onwards - 1200 metres

Grade
 1980–1992 - Group 3
 1993–2004 - Group 2
 2005–2012 - Group 3
 2013 onwards - Group 2

Venue
1980–1992 - Warwick Farm Racecourse 
 1993 - Randwick Racecourse
1994–1999 - Warwick Farm Racecourse 
 2000 - Canterbury Park Racecourse
2001–2004 - Warwick Farm Racecourse 
2005–2006 - Randwick Racecourse
2008 onwards - Warwick Farm Racecourse
 2009 - Randwick Racecourse
2010–2013 - Warwick Farm Racecourse
 2014 onwards - Randwick Racecourse

Winners

 2021 - Swift Witness
 2020 - Dame Giselle
 2019 - Libertini
 2018 - Fiesta
 2017 - Formality
 2016 - Omei Sword
 2015 - Speak Fondly
 2014 - Bring Me The Maid
 2013 - Thump
 2012 - Nechita
 2011 - Pane In The Glass
 2010 - Parables
 2009 - Deer Valley
 2008 - Samantha Miss
 2007 - †race not held
 2006 - Gold Edition
 2005 - Mnemosyne
 2004 - Our Sweet Moss
 2003 - Regimental Gal
 2002 - Victory Vein
 2001 - Ha Ha
 2000 - Ateates
 1999 - Katima
 1998 - Crimson Flight
 1997 - Adeewin
 1996 - Cashier
 1995 - Seika
 1994 - Aragen
 1993 - Angst
 1992 - Skating
 1991 - Pipiwar
 1990 - Triscay
 1989 - Spirited Way
 1988 - Startling Lass
 1987 - Soda Springs
 1986 - Diamond Shower
 1985 - Shankhill Lass
 1984 - Satin Sand
 1983 - Purpose
 1982 - Rosebrook 
 1981 - Black Shoes 
 1980 - Moabite 

† Not held because of outbreak of equine influenza

See also
 List of Australian Group races
 Group races

External links 
 Silver Shadow Stakes (ATC)

References

Horse races in Australia